Senator McManus may refer to:

Edward Joseph McManus (1920–2017), Iowa State Senate
George A. McManus Jr. (born 1930), Michigan State Senate
Michelle McManus (politician) (born 1966), Michigan State Senate
Thomas J. McManus (1864–1926), New York State Senate